Laïla Nehmé (born 1966) is a Lebanese-French archaeologist. A specialist in the archaeology and epigraphy of the Ancient Near East, she is known for her research on Nabatean writings, the evolution of the Nabatean script into the Arabic, and archaeological excavations at Petra and Mada'in Saleh.

Early life
Laïla Nehmé was born in Beirut, Lebanon, where she attended high school. A meeting with a restorer of ceramics from a dig in northern Lebanon prompted her to seek higher studies in archaeology.

Nehmé attended the Pantheon-Sorbonne University, where Jean-Marie Dentzer guided her research between 1991–1994. She wrote her doctoral thesis on Petra in 1994. She began to conduct excavations in Syria and Jordan, and to specialise in the epigraphy of northern Arabic.

Career
Nehmé has been directing excavations at Mada'in Saleh, an ancient Nabatean centre. Her team has discovered several tomb sites, a walled city, comprising mud-brick structures, as well as oases where the granaries and wells supported the local agriculture.

She has studied the transition of scripts from the Nabataean Aramaic to the recognisably Arabic form between the third and fifth centuries AD, replacing the indigenous Arabic alphabet.

Awards
 2010 – Chevalier of the National Order of Merit (France)
 2007 – Prix Clio for Archaeological Research.

Selected works

Articles

Books

References 

1966 births
French archaeologists
Lebanese emigrants to France
Living people
French women archaeologists